Karl Daniel Lidén is a Swedish drummer and music producer. He was the drummer for rock bands Dozer, Demon Cleaner and Greenleaf. He currently has a solo project called Vaka.

Career

Demon Cleaner
Lidén was a founding member of Demon Cleaner, a stoner rock band from Borlange. They released two full-length albums and disbanded in 2002 soon after Lidén left the band.

Greenleaf
While a member of Demon Cleaner Lidén started a side project with Tommi Holappa (Dozer guitar player) and Bengt Bäcke (producer for Dozer and Demon Cleaner) called Greenleaf. They released two albums and an ep with Lidén.

Dozer
Soon after leaving Demon Cleaner, Lidén joined Dozer. He joined after the recording of their third album, Call It Conspiracy. He toured with the band in support of that album and then appeared on their next album Through the Eyes of Heathens before leaving.

Vaka
Originally called And Machine Said.. Behold:, Vaka is Lidén's solo project. Vaka has released one album, Kappa Delta Phi (2008). The album was produced by Lidén and features appearances by Johan Rockner (Dozer), Tommi Holappa (Dozer) and Peder Bergstrand (Lowrider, I Are Droid).

Discography

Demon Cleaner
Split singles with Dozer
 Demon Cleaner vs Dozer (1998) – Molten Universe
 Hawaiian Cottage (1999) – Molten Universe
 Domestic Dudes (1999) – Molten Universe

Albums
 The Freeflight (2000) – Molten Universe
 Demon Cleaner (2002) – Molten Universe

Greenleaf 
 Greenleaf ep (2000) – Molten Universe
 Revolution Rock (2001) – Molten Universe
 Secret Alphabets (2003) – Small Stone Records

Dozer 
 Through the Eyes of Heathens (2006) – Small Stone Records

Vaka 
 Kappa Delta Phi (2008) – Murkhouse Recordings

Other appearances 
 Dozer – Exoskeleton Pt. I & II CD EP (2007) – Molten Universe Recordings – co-producer, engineer, mixer, mastering
 Dozer – Beyond Colossal (2008) – Small Stone Records – co-producer, engineer, mixer
 Switchblade – S/T [2009] (2009) – Trust No One Recordings – co-producer, engineer, mixer
 Kausal – In Dead Cities (2009) – Version Studio Records – engineer, mixer, mastering
 A Swarm of the Sun – Zenith (2010) – Version Studio Records – drums
 Digression Assassins – Alpha (2011) – Ampire Records – engineer, mixer
 Mr. Death – Descending Through Ashes (2011) – Agonia Records – producer, engineer, mixer
 Greenleaf – Nest of Vipers (2012) – Small Stone Records – engineer, mixer
 Propane Propane – Indigo (2012) – Planet Fuzz – mixer
 Doomina – Elsewhere (2012) – self-released – mastering
 Pig Eyes – Total Destruction of the Present Moment (2012) – De:Nihil Records – mastering
 Switchblade – S/T [2012] (2012) – Denovali Records / Trust No One Recordings – engineer, mixer

References

External links
Karl Daniel Lidén Twitter
Karl Daniel Lidén Blogspot
Vaka website
 Karl Daniel Lidén MySpace page
Vaka MySpace page

Swedish drummers
Male drummers
Swedish audio engineers
Living people
Year of birth missing (living people)